Terence Patrick Malley (born August 6, 1954) is an American football coach.

Early life and college playing career
Terence Patrick Malley was born in Killeen, Texas. Malley comes from a line of football coaches. His father is George Patrick "Pat" Malley (1931–1985), under whom Terry Malley would later become an assistant football coach at the University of Santa Clara; grandfather  George L. Malley (1903–1979) served as head coach for the University of San Francisco.

Malley later moved to Saratoga, California and attended Bellarmine College Preparatory in nearby San Jose, graduating in 1972. He lettered in football and baseball at Bellarmine.

At the University of Santa Clara, Malley played quarterback under head coach and father Pat Malley for the Broncos from 1973 to 1976, redshirting one year. Malley graduated from Santa Clara in 1976 with a degree in business management.

Coaching career
Malley began his coaching career at the high school level, starting with Leland High of San Jose in 1976 and 1977, then Moreau Catholic High School in 1978 and 1979. In 1980, Malley joined Pat Malley's coaching staff at Santa Clara as wide receivers and quarterbacks coach at Santa Clara.

Following Pat Malley's death in May 1985, Terry Malley succeeded his late father as Santa Clara head coach. Malley led Santa Clara to an 8–2–1 record in 1985 and was named Western Football Conference Coach of the Year. Malley continued to be head coach until 1992, Santa Clara football's final season before the university discontinued the football program. In eight seasons, Malley had a 47–39–1 record at Santa Clara.

Malley returned to the coaching ranks in 1999, joining Darren Arbet's staff on the San Jose SaberCats of the Arena Football League. Until 2008, Malley was offensive coordinator and assistant head coach of the SaberCats, during which the team won the ArenaBowl championships in 2002, 2004, and 2007. During Malley's tenure as offensive coordinator, the SaberCats averaged over 50 points per game most seasons. The 2002 ArenaBowl champion SaberCats led the AFL in offense with 62.7 points per game. The team had the AFL's second-highest scoring average (55.3) in 2004, then the highest again in 2005 (59.1) and third best in 2006 (56.1).

In 2009, Malley had his first college coaching position since his days at Santa Clara, this time as assistant head coach for offense and quarterbacks coach at San Jose State under Dick Tomey. Following Tomey's retirement, new head coach Mike MacIntyre retained Malley in 2010 as running backs coach and recruiting coordinator; Malley would remain recruiting coordinator for the rest of his tenure at San Jose State. In 2011, Malley moved to coaching wide receivers. He helped San Jose State win the 2012 Military Bowl. Malley worked under his third coach at San Jose State when Ron Caragher became head coach in 2013. Under Caragher, Malley coached tight ends in 2013 and wide receivers in 2014.

In 2015, Malley returned to the San Jose SaberCats as offensive coordinator, again under Arbet.

Administrative career
With the San Jose SaberCats, Malley was director of football operations in 1994 and general manager from 1995 to 2006.

Head coaching record

References

1954 births
Living people
American football quarterbacks
Arena Football League executives
San Jose SaberCats coaches
San Jose State Spartans football coaches
Santa Clara Broncos football coaches
Santa Clara Broncos football players
High school football coaches in California
Sportspeople from Killeen, Texas
People from Saratoga, California
Sportspeople from Santa Clara County, California
Players of American football from California
Players of American football from Texas